Cyrtonus elegans is a species of leaf beetle in the subfamily Chrysomelinae found in Portugal.

References

External links
 
 
 Cyrtonus elegans at biol.uni.wroc.pl (retrieved 4 August 2016)

Chrysomelinae
Beetles described in 1813
Beetles of Europe
Endemic arthropods of Portugal
Taxa named by Ernst Friedrich Germar